The is a list of bisexual people including famous people who identify as bisexual and deceased people who have been identified as bisexual.

A

B

C

D

E

F

References

A
Lists of LGBT-related people
people A